Marzio Bruseghin (born 15 June 1974 in Conegliano, Treviso) is an Italian retired professional road bicycle racer, who competed as a professional between 1997 and 2012. His best achievement was winning the 2006 Italian time-trial championship, as well as winning two time trial stages in the Giro d'Italia. In 2008 he completed all three Grand Tours, including a podium finish (Giro) and a top 10 finish (Vuelta).

Major results

2001
 1st Stage 4 Volta a Portugal
 8th Overall Volta a Catalunya
2002
 8th Overall Critérium du Dauphiné Libéré
2004
 6th Giro di Lombardia
 6th Firenze–Pistoia
 7th Giro Colline del Chianti
2005
 2nd Time trial, National Road Championships
 8th Overall Deutschland Tour
 8th Overall Critérium du Dauphiné Libéré
 9th Overall Giro d'Italia
2006
 1st  Time trial, National Road Championships
 6th Overall Deutschland Tour
 9th Overall Tour de Pologne
2007
 1st Stage 1 Tour de Pologne
 8th Overall Giro d'Italia
1st Stage 13 (ITT)
2008
 3rd Overall Giro d'Italia
1st Stage 10 (ITT)
 10th Overall Vuelta a España
2009
 9th Overall Giro d'Italia
 9th Gran Premio Industria e Commercio di Prato
2012
 9th Memorial Marco Pantani

Grand Tour general classification results timeline

References

External links 
Official personal website
Profile at Lampre-Fonditalofficial website

1974 births
Living people
Italian male cyclists
Italian Giro d'Italia stage winners
Cyclists at the 2008 Summer Olympics
Olympic cyclists of Italy
Cyclists from the Province of Treviso